Hackberry is a ghost town in Gove County, Kansas, United States.

History
The Hackberry Mills, Wallace County, Kansas post office issued in 1879 was moved to Hackberry in 1881. The post office was discontinued in 1888, then reissued from 1898 to 1931.

References

Further reading

External links
 Gove County maps: Current, Historic, KDOT

Former populated places in Gove County, Kansas
Former populated places in Kansas